Pelochrista agrestana is a species of moth belonging to the family Tortricidae.

Synonym:
 Sciaphila agrestana Treitschke, 1830 (= basionym)

References

Moths described in 1830